Newsome High School may refer to:
Newsome Academy, a co-educational secondary school located in Newsome, England formerly known as Newsome High School.
Newsome High School, a public high school in Lithia, Florida, United States.